David Edgar Cartwright FRS (21 October 1926 – 2 December 2015) was an oceanographer.

Biography
Edgar David Cartwright was born on 21 October 1926 in Stoke Newington, London. His father, Edgar Athelstan Canynge Cartwright ran a detective agency, while his mother Lucienne Eugenie Taranson was a schoolteacher and pianist from France. The family moved to Worthing in Sussex when Cartwright was two and took over a hotel. After primary school he attended Worthing High School for Boys

In 1944, he started his higher education at St John's College, Cambridge (BA in natural science and electronics) and in 1949, he enrolled King's College London (BSc; DSc). After graduating in 1951, he started working at Department of Naval Construction. The following year, he married Anne-Marie Guerin, who he had met at his parents' hotel. The couple would go on to have four children, two daughters and two sons.

Cartwright was made a Fellow of the Royal Society in 1984 He was also a Fellow of the Royal Astronomical Society and the American Geophysical Union. Cartwright died in West Sussex on 2 December 2015.

Works
Between 1954 and 1973, Cartwright worked for the National Institute of Oceanography, where he focused on problems related to sea waves, as well as work on the statistics of wave heights which would be used in the design off-shore oil rigs.

In 1974, he was appointed head of Institute of Oceanographic Sciences, overseeing research groups. He retired from Bidston in 1986, and worked for a few years at Goddard Space Flight Center, before acting as a NASA consultant in the early 1990s. He published Tides - a Scientific History in 1999, as well as approximately eighty papers on marine science during his career.

References

1926 births
2015 deaths
Alumni of St John's College, Cambridge
Alumni of King's College London
Fellows of the Royal Society
Fellows of the Royal Astronomical Society
Fellows of the American Geophysical Union
British oceanographers